Pascal Richard (born 1972) is a Canadian skeleton racer who competed from the late 1990s to 2002. He finished 15th in the men's skeleton event at the 2002 Winter Olympics in Salt Lake City.

At the FIBT World Championships, Richard earned his best finish of 14th in the men's skeleton event at Igls in 2000. He retired after the 2002 games in Salt Lake City.

References
2002 men's skeleton results
Canadiansport.com article on the 2002-03 Canadian bobsleigh and skeleton team, including Richard's retirement.
Skeletonsport.com profile

Canadian male skeleton racers
Living people
Skeleton racers at the 2002 Winter Olympics
1972 births
Olympic skeleton racers of Canada
20th-century Canadian people
21st-century Canadian people